Magdalene Sibylle of Prussia (31 December 1586 – 12 February 1659) was an Electress of Saxony as the spouse of John George I, Elector of Saxony. She is a 6th times matrilineal great grandmother to Queen Victoria of the United Kingdom and the matrilineal great-great-great grandmother to Catherine the Great of Russia.

Life
She was born in Königsberg, the daughter of Albert Frederick, Duke of Prussia and Marie Eleonore of Cleves. She married John George on 19 July 1607 in Torgau.
She was a great-granddaughter of Ferdinand I, Holy Roman Emperor. She is also in three ways an ancestor of Augusta of Saxe-Gotha, mother of George III of the United Kingdom. In that way, she connected the ancestry of the British monarchs to the Catholic Monarchs.
She was a friend of the Swedish queen Maria Eleonora of Brandenburg, her niece, and was interested in painting, poetry and gardening. 
She used Swedish prisoners of war to work on the Dresdner Festungsbau ("Dresden fortress"). 
As a widow in 1656, she retired to the Dresdner Frau Kurfürstin-Haus and died in Dresden in 1659.

Children
She had ten children:

 Stillborn son (Dresden, 18 July 1608)
 Sophie Eleonore (Dresden, 23 November 1609 – Darmstadt, 2 June 1671), married on 1 April 1627 Landgrave Georg II of Hesse-Darmstadt
 Marie Elisabeth (Dresden, 22 November 1610 – Husum, 24 October 1684), married on 21 February 1630 Duke Frederick III of Holstein-Gottorp
 Christian Albert (Dresden, 4 March 1612 – Dresden, 9 August 1612)
 Johann Georg II (Dresden, 31 May 1613 – Freiberg, 22 August 1680), successor of his father as Elector of Saxony
 August (Dresden, 13 August 1614 – Halle, 4 August 1680), inherited Weissenfels as Duke.
 Christian I (Dresden, 27 October 1615 – Merseburg, 18 October 1691), inherited Merseburg as Duke
 Magdalene Sibylle (Dresden, 23 December 1617 – Schloss Altenburg, 6 January 1668), married firstly on 5 October 1634 to Crown Prince Christian, eldest son and heir of King Christian IV of Denmark; and secondly, on 11 October 1652, to Duke Frederick Wilhelm II of Saxe-Altenburg
 Maurice (Dresden, 28 March 1619 – Moritzburg, 4 December 1681), inherited Zeitz as Duke
 Heinrich (Dresden, 27 June 1622 – Dresden, 15 August 1622).

Ancestry

References
 Franz Otto Stichart: Galerie der sächsischen Fürstinnen; biogr. Skizzen sämtlicher Ahnfrauen des kgl. Hauses Sachsen. Leipzig 1857
 Heinrich Theodor Flathe: Magdalena Sibylla. In: Allgemeine Deutsche Biographie (ADB). Band 20, Duncker & Humblot, Leipzig 1884, p. 49.

External links 

|-

1586 births
1659 deaths
Electoral Princesses of Saxony
Electresses of Saxony
Nobility from Königsberg
⚭Duchess Magdalene Sibylle of Prussia
Burials at Freiberg Cathedral
Daughters of monarchs